Raspe is a surname. Notable people with the surname include:

Henry Raspe (1204–1247), Landgrave of Thuringia
Jan-Carl Raspe (1944–1977), urban guerilla
Jeff Raspe (born 1966), Music Director, WBJB, 90.5 The Night, Brookdale Public Radio
Rudolf Erich Raspe (1736–1794), writer